Daniel Camille Bernard (born 1946) is a French businessman, the former chairman of Kingfisher plc.

Early life
Daniel Camille Bernard was born in February 1946.

Career
Bernard was chairman and CEO of Carrefour from 1992 to 2005.

Bernard was the chairman of Kingfisher plc from June 2009, having been deputy chairman since May 2006. He is president of Provestis, his own investment company, and since January 2010, chairman of MAF Retail Group, Dubai. He is senior advisor of TowerBrook Capital Partners since October 2010. He is a non-executive director of Capgemini, and honorary chairman of the HEC Business School Foundation in Paris and a member of HEC's advisory board.

In June 2017, Bernard was succeeded by Andy Cosslett as chairman of Kingfisher.

Personal life
He lives in France.

References

1946 births
French businesspeople
French chief executives
Living people
HEC Paris alumni